Brian Nicolás Torrealba Silva (born July 14, 1997) is a Chilean footballer who plays as a defender for the Primera División de Chile club O'Higgins.

Club career

Youth career

Figueroa started his career at Primera División de Chile club O'Higgins. He progressed from the under categories club all the way to the senior team.

O'Higgins

Torrealba made his debut in the first team on May 15, 2013, in the match against Santiago Wanderers, playing the 90 minutes.

In the 2015–16 Clausura, Torrealba was runner-up with O'Higgins, after lose in the last matchday against Universidad de Concepción, being Universidad Católica the champions of the Campeonato Nacional.

International career
Along with Chile U20, he won the L'Alcúdia Tournament in 2015. He also took part in the 2015 South American U-20 Championship.

Honours
Chile U-20
L'Alcúdia International Football Tournament: 2015

References

External links
 

1997 births
Living people
People from Rancagua
Chilean footballers
Chile under-20 international footballers
Association football defenders
Chilean Primera División players
Primera B de Chile players
O'Higgins F.C. footballers
Rangers de Talca footballers